St. Olaf's Church in Tyrvää is a late medieval fieldstone church in Tyrvää, Sastamala, Finland. It is located on the shore of lake Rautavesi. The church was built approximately in 1510–1516 and burnt down by a burglar on 21 September 1997.

The church was rebuilt by local people and the interior paintings were created by painters Kuutti Lavonen and Osmo Rauhala.

The reconstruction of the church is documented in the book St. Olaf's Church in Tyrvää by Kuutti Lavonen, Osmo Rauhala, and Pirjo Silveri.

References

External links
 
 St Olaf’s Church in Tyrvää
 Contemporary church painters create spirit of renovated 16th church, in Helsingin Sanomat

Sastamala
Medieval stone churches in Finland
Rebuilt churches
Churches completed in 1516
16th-century Lutheran churches
Buildings and structures in Pirkanmaa
Lutheran churches in Finland
Lutheran churches converted from Roman Catholicism
Tyrvää